Oxford Bible may refer to:

 The standard version of the King James Bible, first published in 1769
 Oxford Annotated Bible, a study Bible first published in 1962
 Other bibles published by the Oxford University Press